Tang Rud (also Romanized as Tang Rūd; also known as Tankrūd) is a village in Deylaman Rural District, Deylaman District, Siahkal County, Gilan Province, Iran. At the 2006 census, its population was 88, in 25 families.

References 

Populated places in Siahkal County